Full Blooded (also known as Da Hound) is an American rapper formerly signed to Master P's No Limit Records in the late 1990s.

Full Blooded made his debut in 1998 on C-Murder's debut album Life or Death on the song titled "On The Run" and on the song titled "Ghetto Ties". He would continue to make guest appearances on several No Limit albums before releasing his debut album Memorial Day on December 1, 1998. Unlike most No Limit albums, Memorial Day was a commercial disappointment, only reaching number 112 on the Billboard 200. Full Blooded left No Limit shortly after and released his second album, Untamed in 2001. Because Of Memorial Day's failure, it was in print until 2003.

Discography

Studio albums

Collaboration albums

Compilation albums

Singles

As lead artist

References

African-American male rappers
No Limit Records artists
Rappers from New Orleans
Gangsta rappers
Living people
21st-century American rappers
21st-century American male musicians
Year of birth missing (living people)
21st-century African-American musicians